Özkan Baltacı (born 13 February 1994) is a Turkish hammer thrower.

In age-specific categories he won the silver medal at the 2011 World Youth Championships, the bronze medal at the 2011 European Youth Olympic Festival and finished tenth at the 2012 World Junior Championships. He also competed at the 2010 World Junior Championships and the 2015 European U23 Championships without reaching the final.

He finished ninth at the 2016 European Championships, won the silver medal at the 2017 Islamic Solidarity Games, finished fifth at the 2017 Universiade and finished twelfth at the 2017 World Championships. He also competed at the 2018 European Championships without reaching the final. He won the gold medal at the Athletics at the 2019 Summer Universiade held in Naples, Italy.

His personal best throw is 76.84 metres, achieved in May 2018 in Mersin.

References

1994 births
Living people
Turkish hammer throwers
World Athletics Championships athletes for Turkey
Universiade gold medalists in athletics (track and field)
Universiade gold medalists for Turkey
Medalists at the 2019 Summer Universiade
Islamic Solidarity Games competitors for Turkey
Athletes (track and field) at the 2020 Summer Olympics
Olympic athletes of Turkey
Olympic male hammer throwers
Mediterranean Games gold medalists in athletics
Mediterranean Games gold medalists for Turkey
Athletes (track and field) at the 2022 Mediterranean Games
Competitors at the 2022 Mediterranean Games
21st-century Turkish people